The Nashua Pirates were a minor league baseball team, based in Nashua, New Hampshire. The team started in 1983 as the Nashua Angels, an affiliate with the California Angels in the Eastern League. The club changed affiliations in 1984 to the Pittsburgh Pirates and were then renamed the Nashua Pirates. The team's home ballpark was Holman Stadium.

During the mid-1980s, Harrisburg, Pennsylvania initiated a plan to construct a ballpark for a new Minor League Baseball team in the city. This ballpark, named Riverside Stadium, attracted the Pirates, which moved the Nashua affiliate to Harrisburg. The team was renamed the Harrisburg Senators, a nod to the previous Senators franchise.

Season-by-season

Notes 

Defunct Eastern League (1938–present) teams
Baseball teams established in 1983
Baseball teams disestablished in 1986
California Angels minor league affiliates
Pittsburgh Pirates minor league affiliates
Professional baseball teams in New Hampshire
1983 establishments in New Hampshire
1986 disestablishments in New Hampshire
Sports in Nashua, New Hampshire
Defunct baseball teams in New Hampshire